Sar Tang-e Mugarmun (also Romanized as Sar Tang-e Mūgarmūn; also known as Sar Tang-e Āzādī) is a village in Vahdat Rural District, Mugarmun District, Landeh County, Kohgiluyeh and Boyer-Ahmad Province, Iran. At the 2006 census, its population was 34, in 5 families.

References 

Populated places in Landeh County